Ban Sang station is a railway station located in Ban Sang Subdistrict, Ban Sang District, Prachinburi Province.

References 

Railway stations in Thailand
Prachinburi province